Shields is an unincorporated community in Lane County, Kansas, United States.

History
A post office was opened in Shields in 1887, and remained in operation until it was discontinued in 1994.

Education
The community is served by Dighton USD 482 public school district.

References

Further reading

External links
 Lane County maps: Current, Historic, KDOT

Unincorporated communities in Lane County, Kansas
Unincorporated communities in Kansas